Volero Le Cannet is  a French volleyball club based in Le Cannet. It was formed by the elite team of Volero Zürich joining Entente sportive Le Cannet-Rocheville.

Team
As of December 2018.
The following is the roster of the club in the 2018 FIVB Volleyball Women's Club World Championship.

 Head coach:  Avital Selinger

References

French volleyball clubs
Volleyball clubs established in 2018
2018 establishments in France